Chionodes hapsus is a moth in the family Gelechiidae. It is found in North America, where it has been recorded from southern Ontario, New Jersey, New York, Maryland, Kentucky, Pennsylvania, Ohio, Missouri, Oklahoma and Arkansas.

The larvae feed on Quercus alba and Quercus macrocarpa.

References

Chionodes
Moths described in 1999
Moths of North America